Ayub Bridge (Sindhi: ايوب پل), named after Field Marshal Mohammad Ayub Khan (President of Pakistan), is a railway bridge over the Indus river between Rohri and Sukkur  in Sindh province, Pakistan. The bridge is about 806 feet long, 247 feet high and cost Rs21.6 million. It has served the city for 50 years by providing a strong link for rail traffic between Sukkur and Rohri. Before this, Lansdowne Bridge was the railway link between Sukkur and Rohri.  The foundation stone of this steel arch bridge was laid on 9 December 1960 and inaugurated by President Muhammad Ayub Khan on 6 May 1962. The consulting engineer was David B. Steinman. The Ayub Bridge became the world's third longest railway arch span and the first railway bridge in the world to be slung on coiled wire rope suspenders.

History
Before the bridges, the transport between Sukkur and Rohri was by boats and steamers. Boatman Mir Mohammad alias Miroo recalled how his father Yar Mohammad used to run a small service between Sukkur and Rohri till the early sixties. “Very few people had cars or motorcycles at that time and therefore motor boats were the only way of communication.” Some people used to cross the River Indus by Lansdowne Bridge on bicycle. The train used to run in the center of the bridge and pedestrians and cyclists used the wooden walkways at both sides.

The fare for a single adult passenger was one anna (0.06 PKR) back in the day. They charged half for a child.
The construction of Ayub Bridge started on November 26, 1959 and its foundation stone was laid on December 9, 1960 by the then minister of railways and communication, Khan FM Khan, Khan of Shewa. The contractor of the bridge was M/S Dorman Long Gammon of London, famous for Sydney Harbour Bridge in 1932. The consulting engineer was DB Steinman of New York – the man who reconstructed the famous Brooklyn Bridge in New York. Field Marshal Mohammad Ayub Khan inaugurated the bridge on the Sunday 6 May 1962.

Construction work
The rationale behind construction of this arc bridge over the Indus is rocks in the river bed which do not allow the pillars to withstand the constant flow and pressure of water for a long time. The construction phase of Ayub Bridge was interesting as first of all four huge cemented abutments, two on each side of the river banks, were made. These abutments have to bear weight of the arc. In arc bridges, construction work has to start simultaneously from both sides of the river.

Therefore, two half arches supporting the deck with cables were built which were joined as one, to the amusement of the people witnessing the activity. The engineer would climb up the arcs through a ladder every day to physically check the strength of hundreds of rivets used in the bridge. Rivet is a metal pin used for fastening two pieces of metal together. It was a frightening sight not only for us but also for others watching, with the mighty Indus flowing beneath.

Ayub Bridge is a living example of a magnificent structure built with the joint efforts of engineers of Dorman Long and Company and the Pakistan Railways. It also reflects the passion and sincerity of the people at the helm of affairs of Railways at that time to bring about tangible improvements in the country's transportation systems.

When the great steel Ayub arch was constructed (1960–1962), railway traffic was shifted from Lansdowne Bridge to it. About a hundred feet apart, the two bridges seem like one from a distance. The Ayub arch became the world's third longest railway arch span and the first bridge in the world to have "the railway desk slung on coiled wire rope suspenders."

See also
 Sukkur District
 Lansdowne Bridge Rohri
 Sukkur Barrage
 Sukkur

References

Bridges in Sindh
Buildings and structures in Sindh
Bridges over the Indus River
Railway bridges in Pakistan
Tourist attractions in Sukkur
Bridges completed in 1962
1962 establishments in Pakistan